The 2021–22 San Antonio Spurs season was the 55th season of the franchise, its 46th in the National Basketball Association (NBA), and its 49th in the San Antonio area. For the first time since 2010–11, long-time point guard Patty Mills is not on the roster, as he signed with the Brooklyn Nets on August 10, 2021. Mills was previously the longest tenured player on the Spurs roster, and the last player from the 2013–14 championship season to remain on the roster. Mills' departure made sixth-year point guard Dejounte Murray the new longest tenured player on the roster. 

On April 5, 2022, the Spurs became the 20th and final team to clinch a postseason position, clinching a spot in the elimination round in the Play-In Tournament for the second consecutive year, qualifying for the second consecutive year in the first stage as the No. 10 seed. However, they lost to the New Orleans Pelicans in the Play-In tournament, eliminating the Spurs from the playoffs for the third consecutive season.

Draft

The Spurs currently carry one first-round pick and one second-round pick.

Roster

Standings

Division

Conference

Schedule

Preseason

|-style="background:#cfc;"
| 1
| October 4
| Utah
| 
| Murray, Primo (17)
| Jakob Pöltl (10)
| Drew Eubanks (4)
| AT&T Center10,174
| 1–0
|-style="background:#fcc;"
| 2
| October 6
| @ Detroit
| 
| Bryn Forbes (20)
| Derrick White (7)
| Derrick White (9)
| Little Caesars Arena5,423
| 1–1
|-style="background:#fcc;"
| 3
| October 8
| Miami
| 
| Keldon Johnson (23)
| Drew Eubanks (8)
| Dejounte Murray (6)
| AT&T Center15,160
| 1–2
|-style="background:#cfc;"
| 4
| October 10
| @ Orlando
| 
| Dejounte Murray (18)
| Jakob Pöltl (9)
| Lonnie Walker (5)
| Amway Center12,509
| 2–2
|-style="background:#cfc;"
| 5
| October 15
| Houston
| 
| Murray, White (20)
| Drew Eubanks (9)
| Dejounte Murray (7)
| AT&T Center17,676
| 3–2

Regular season

|-style="background:#cfc;"
| 1
| October 20
| Orlando
| 
| Devin Vassell (19)
| Jakob Pöltl (13)
| Dejounte Murray (9)
| AT&T Center16,697
| 1–0
|-style="background:#fcc;"
| 2
| October 22
| @ Denver
| 
| Keldon Johnson (27)
| Dejounte Murray (9)
| Derrick White (8)
| Ball Arena19,520
| 1–1
|-style="background:#fcc;"
| 3
| October 23
| Milwaukee
| 
| Doug McDermott (25)
| Dejounte Murray (9)
| Derrick White (8)
| AT&T Center14,353
| 1–2
|-style="background:#fcc;"
| 4
| October 26
| L.A. Lakers
| 
| Jakob Pöltl (27)
| Jakob Pöltl (14)
| Dejounte Murray (15)
| AT&T Center18,354
| 1–3
|-style="background:#fcc;"
| 5
| October 28
| @ Dallas
| 
| Dejounte Murray (23)
| Jakob Pöltl (13)
| Dejounte Murray (8)
| American Airlines Center19,228
| 1–4
|-style="background:#cfc;"
| 6
| October 30
| @ Milwaukee
| 
| Dejounte Murrary (23)
| Keldon Johnson (11)
| Dejounte Murray (9)
| Fiserv Forum17,341
| 2–4

|-style="background:#fcc;"
| 7
| November 1
| @ Indiana
| 
| Dejounte Murray (16)
| Jakob Pöltl (6)
| Derrick White (7)
| Gainbridge Fieldhouse10,227
| 2–5
|-style="background:#fcc;"
| 8
| November 3
| @ Dallas
| 
| Dejounte Murray (23)
| Dejounte Murray (9)
| Dejounte Murray (8)
| AT&T Center16,356
| 2–6
|-style="background:#cfc;"
| 9
| November 5
| @ Orlando
| 
| Dejounte Murrary (20)
| Dejounte Murray (11)
| Dejounte Murray (7)
| Amway Center14,101
| 3–6
|-style="background:#fcc;"
| 10
| November 7
| @ Oklahoma City
| 
| Keldon Johnson (22)
| Drew Eubanks (11)
| Dejounte Murray (9)
| Paycom Center12,972
| 3–7
|-style="background:#cfc;"
| 11
| November 10
| Sacramento
| 
| Dejounte Murray (26)
| Keldon Johnson (12)
| Thaddeus Young (8)
| AT&T Center15,065
| 4–7
|-style="background:#fcc;"
| 12
| November 12
| Dallas
| 
| Devin Vassell (20)
| Keldon Johnson (9)
| White, Young (5)
| AT&T Center13,425
| 4–8
|-style="background:#fcc;"
| 13
| November 14
| @ L.A. Lakers
|  
| Keldon Johnson (24)
| Dejounte Murray (10)
| Dejounte Murray (10)
| Staples Center18,997
| 4–9
|-style="background:#fcc;"
| 14
| November 16
| @ L.A. Clippers
| 
| Dejounte Murray (26)
| Dejounte Murray (12)
| Dejounte Murray (9)
| Staples Center13,298
| 4–10
|-style="background:#fcc;"
| 15
| November 18
| @ Minnesota
| 
| Devin Vassell (18)
| Dejounte Murray (8)
| Murray, White (4)
| Target Center13,572
| 4–11
|-style="background:#fcc;"
| 16
| November 22
| Phoenix
| 
| Derrick White (19)
| Dejounte Murray (10)
| Dejounte Murray (11)
| AT&T Center14,715
| 4–12
|-style="background:#fcc;"
| 17
| November 24
| Atlanta
| 
| Bryn Forbes (23)
| Jakob Pöltl (10)
| Dejounte Murray (11)
| AT&T Center13,161
| 4–13
|-style="background:#cfc;"
| 18
| November 26
| Boston
| 
| Dejounte Murray (29)
| Keldon Johnson (14)
| Derrick White (19)
| AT&T Center15,360
| 5–13
|-style="background:#cfc;"
| 19
| November 29
| Washington
| 
| Derrick White (24)
| Jakob Pöltl (11)
| Dejounte Murray (8)
| AT&T Center12,606
| 6–13

|-style="background:#cfc;"
| 20
| December 2
| @ Portland
| 
| Bryn Forbes (18)
| Jakob Pöltl (9)
| Dejounte Murray (13)
| Moda Center16,143
| 7–13
|-style="background:#cfc;"
| 21
| December 4
| @ Golden State
| 
| Derrick White (25)
| Dejounte Murray (12)
| Dejounte Murray (7)
| Chase Center18,064
| 8–13
|-style="background:#fcc;"
| 22
| December 6
| @ Phoenix
| 
| Dejounte Murray (17)
| Jakob Pöltl (11)
| Dejounte Murray (14)
| Footprint Center15,292
| 8–14
|-style="background:#fcc;"
| 23
| December 7
| New York
| 
| Derrick White (26)
| Jakob Pöltl (8)
| Murray, White (7)
| AT&T Center14,698
| 8–15
|-style="background:#cfc;"
| 24
| December 9
| Denver
| 
| Derrick White (23)
| Bates-Diop, Pöltl (9) 
| Dejounte Murray (9)
| AT&T Center12,855
| 9–15
|-style="background:#fcc;"
| 25
| December 11
| Denver
| 
| Lonnie Walker IV (16)
| Tre Jones (9)
| Tre Jones (5)
| AT&T Center14,607
| 9–16
|-style="background:#cfc;"
| 26
| December 12
| New Orleans
| 
| Pöltl, White (24)
| Murray, Pöltl (12)
| Dejounte Murray (10)
| AT&T Center14,990
| 10–16
|-style="background:#fcc;"
| 27
| December 15
| Charlotte
| 
| Bryn Forbes (25)
| Murray, White (6)
| Dejounte Murray (9)
| AT&T Center14,354
| 10–17
|-style="background:#cfc;"
| 28
| December 17
| @ Utah
| 
| Keldon Johnson (24)
| Dejounte Murray (11)
| Dejounte Murray (11)
| Vivint Arena18,306
| 11–17
|-style="background:#fcc;"
| 29
| December 19
| @ Sacramento
| 
| Dejounte Murray (25)
| Keldon Johnson (11)
| Dejounte Murray (9)
| Golden 1 Center15,091
| 11–18
|-style="background:#cfc;"
| 30
| December 20
| @ L.A. Clippers
| 
| Dejounte Murray (24)
| Dejounte Murray (12)
| Dejounte Murray (13)
| Staples Center18,096
| 12–18
|-style="background:#cfc;"
| 31
| December 23
| @ L.A. Lakers
| 
| Keita Bates-Diop (30)
| Keldon Johnson (10)
| Dejounte Murray (13)
| Staples Center18,997
| 13–18
|-style="background:#cfc;"
| 32
| December 26
| Detroit
| 
| Keldon Johnson (27)
| Drew Eubanks (7)
| Tre Jones (11)
| AT&T Center14,715
| 14–18
|-style="background:#fcc;"
| 33
| December 27
| Utah
| 
| Derrick White (21)
| Jakob Pöltl (13)
| Derrick White (8)
| AT&T Center16,255
| 14–19
|-style="background:#bbb;"
| —
| December 29
| Miami
| colspan="6"|Postponed due to COVID-19 pandemic
|-style="background:#fcc;"
| 34
| December 31
| @ Memphis
|  
| Forbes, Pöltl & White (15)
| Keita Bates-Diop (11)
| Derrick White (9)
| FedExForum15,412
| 14–20

|-style="background:#fcc;"
| 35
| January 1
| @ Detroit
| 
| Bryn Forbes (27)
| Jakob Pöltl (12)
| Derrick White (14)
| Little Caesars Arena18,911
| 14–21
|-style="background:#fcc;"
| 36
| January 4
| @ Toronto
| 
| Jakob Pöltl (19)
| Jakob Pöltl (12)
| Johnson, Jones, Pöltl, Primo (4)
| Scotiabank Arena0
| 14–22
|-style="background:#cfc;"
| 37
| January 5
| @ Boston
|  
| Dejounte Murray (22)
| Jakob Pöltl (14)
| Dejounte Murray (12)
| TD Garden19,156
| 15–22
|-style="background:#fcc;"
| 38
| January 7
| @ Philadelphia
| 
| Dejounte Murray (27)
| Jakob Pöltl (6)
| Dejounte Murray (9)
| Wells Fargo Center20,265
| 15–23
|-style="background:#fcc;"
| 39
| January 9
| @ Brooklyn
| 
| Lonnie Walker IV (25)
| Jakob Pöltl (12)
| Dejounte Murray (12)
| Barclays Center15,606
| 15–24
|-style="background:#fcc;"
| 40
| January 10
| @ New York
| 
| Dejounte Murray (24)
| Cacok, Pöltl (10)
| Dejounte Murray (5)
| Madison Square Garden16,569
| 15–25
|-style="background:#fcc;"
| 41
| January 12
| Houston
| 
| Dejounte Murray (32)
| Dejounte Murray (10)
| Dejounte Murray (11)
| AT&T Center11,314
| 15–26
|-style="background:#fcc;"
| 42
| January 14
| Cleveland
| 
| Dejounte Murray (30)
| Dejounte Murray (14)
| Dejounte Murray (8)
| AT&T Center12,160
| 15–27
|-style="background:#cfc;"
| 43
| January 15
| L.A. Clippers
| 
| Derrick White (19)
| Landale, Vassell (11)
| Dejounte Murray (9)
| AT&T Center13,223
| 16–27
|-style="background:#fcc;"
| 44
| January 17
| Phoenix
| 
| Jakob Pöltl (23)
| Jakob Pöltl (14)
| Derrick White (7)
| AT&T Center10,422
| 16–28
|-style="background:#cfc;"
| 45
| January 19
| Oklahoma City
| 
| Dejounte Murray (23)
| Dejounte Murray (10)
| Dejounte Murray (14)
| AT&T Center11,848
| 17–28
|-style="background:#fcc;"
| 46
| January 21
| Brooklyn
| 
| Dejounte Murray (25)
| Dejounte Murray (12)
| Dejounte Murray (10)
| AT&T Center15,068
| 17–29
|-style="background:#fcc;"
| 47
| January 23
| Philadelphia
| 
| Jakob Pöltl (25)
| Jakob Pöltl (10)
| Dejounte Murray (12)
| AT&T Center16,437
| 17–30
|-style="background:#cfc;"
| 48
| January 25
| @ Houston
| 
| Dejounte Murray (19)
| Eubanks, Pöltl (9)
| Dejounte Murray (10)
| Toyota Center15,007
| 18–30
|-style="background:#fcc;"
| 49
| January 26
| Memphis
| 
| Devin Vassell (20)
| Dejounte Murray (10)
| Dejounte Murray (11)
| AT&T Center14,662
| 18–31
|-style="background:#cfc;"
| 50
| January 28
| Chicago
| 
| Dejounte Murray (29)
| Jakob Pöltl (11) 
| Dejounte Murray (12)
| AT&T Center18,354
| 19–31
|-style="background:#fcc;"
| 51
| January 30
| @ Phoenix
| 
| Doug McDermott (24)
| Keldon Johnson (8)
| Tre Jones (9)
| Footprint Center17,071
| 19–32

|-style="background:#fcc;"
| 52
| February 1
| Golden State
|  
| Dejounte Murray (27)
| Dejounte Murray (9)
| Dejounte Murray (9)
| AT&T Center17,070
| 19–33
|-style="background:#fcc;"
| 53
| February 3
| Miami
| 
| Derrick White (22)
| Thaddeus Young (8) 
| Jones, Johnson, Vassell, Young (3)
| AT&T Center14,971
| 19–34
|- style="background:#cfc;"
| 54
| February 4
| Houston
| 
| Keldon Johnson (28) 
| Jakob Pöltl (10)
| Dejounte Murray (11)
| AT&T Center15,344
| 20–34
|-style="background:#fcc;"
| 55
| February 9
| @ Cleveland
| 
| Vassell, Johnson (18)
| Jakob Pöltl (11)
| Dejounte Murray (9)
| Rocket Mortgage FieldHouse19,432
| 20–35
|-style="background:#cfc;"
| 56
| February 11
| @ Atlanta
| 
| Dejounte Murray (32)
| Dejounte Murray (10)
| Dejounte Murray (15)
| State Farm Arena17,234
| 21–35
|-style="background:#cfc;"
| 57
| February 12
| @ New Orleans
| 
| Dejounte Murray (31)
| Jakob Pöltl (11)
| Dejounte Murray (12)
| Smoothie King Center16,615
| 22–35
|-style="background:#fcc;"
| 58
| February 14
| @ Chicago
| 
| Lonnie Walker IV (21)
| Jakob Pöltl (9)
| Dejounte Murray (11)
| United Center21,153
| 22–36
|-style="background:#cfc;"
| 59
| February 16
| @ Oklahoma City
| 
| Keldon Johnson (22)
| Jakob Pöltl (17)
| Dejounte Murray (8) 
| Paycom Center14,920
| 23–36
|-style="background:#cfc;"
| 60
| February 25
| @ Washington
| 
| Keldon Johnson (32)
| Dejounte Murray (13)
| Dejounte Murray (14)
| Capital One Arena15,302
| 24–36
|-style="background:#fcc;"
| 61
| February 26
| @ Miami
| 
| Bates-Diop, Vassell, Walker (22)
| Keita Bates-Diop (11)
| Tre Jones (11)
| FTX Arena19,677
| 24–37
|-style="background:#fcc;"
| 62
| February 28
| @ Memphis
| 
| Lonnie Walker IV (22)
| Jakob Pöltl (10)
| Dejounte Murray (8)
| FedExForum16,812
| 24–38

|-style="background:#fcc;"
| 63
| March 3
| Sacramento
| 
| Lonnie Walker IV (30)
| Dejounte Murray (12)
| Dejounte Murray (7)
| AT&T Center13,049
| 24–39
|-style="background:#fcc;"
| 64
| March 5
| @ Charlotte
| 
| Keldon Johnson (33)
| Zach Collins (10)
| Dejounte Murray (10)
| Spectrum Center18,941
| 24–40
|-style="background:#cfc;"
| 65
| March 7
| L.A. Lakers
| 
| Dejounte Murray (26) 
| Dejounte Murray (10) 
| Dejounte Murray (8) 
| AT&T Center18,354
| 25–40
|-style="background:#fcc;"
| 66
| March 9
| Toronto
| 
| Keldon Johnson (27)
| Jakob Pöltl (12)
| Dejounte Murray (12)
| AT&T Center15,121
| 25–41
|-style="background:#cfc;"
| 67
| March 11
| Utah
| 
| Dejounte Murray (27)
| Jakob Pöltl (11)
| Dejounte Murray (4)
| AT&T Center15,753
| 26–41
|-style="background:#fcc;"
| 68
| March 12
| Indiana
| 
| Jock Landale (26)
| Tre Jones (10)
| Tre Jones (12)
| AT&T Center14,605
| 26–42
|-style="background:#fcc;"
| 69
| March 14
| Minnesota
| 
| Keldon Johnson (34)
| Keldon Johnson (8)
| Dejounte Murray (12)
| AT&T Center14,143
| 26–43
|-style="background:#cfc;"
| 70
| March 16
| Oklahoma City
| 
| Dejounte Murray (26)
| Jakob Pöltl (14)
| Dejounte Murray (12)
| AT&T Center14,994
| 27–43
|-style="background:#fcc;"
| 71
| March 18
| New Orleans
| 
| Devin Vassell (18)
| Dejounte Murray (9)
| Dejounte Murray (5)
| AT&T Center18,354
| 27–44
|-style="background:#cfc;"
| 72
| March 20
| @ Golden State
| 
| Josh Richardson (25)
| Jakob Pöltl (14)
| Dejounte Murray (8)
| Chase Center18,064
| 28–44
|-style="background:#cfc;
| 73
| March 23
| @ Portland
| 
| Dejounte Murray (28) 
| Collins, Pöltl (9)
| Tre Jones (9)
| Moda Center16,610
| 29–44
|-style="background:#cfc;
| 74
| March 26
| @ New Orleans
| 
| Keldon Johnson (21)
| Murray, Pöltl (11)
| Dejounte Murray (13)
| Smoothie King Center13,097
| 30–44
|-style="background:#cfc;
| 75
| March 28
| @ Houston
| 
| Dejounte Murray (33)
| Jakob Pöltl (13)
| Dejounte Murray (11)
| Toyota Center18,055
| 31–44
|-style="background:#fcc;
| 76
| March 30
| Memphis
| 
| Dejounte Murray (33) 
| Dejounte Murray (13)
| Pöltl, Richardson (5) 
| AT&T Center15,821
| 31–45

|-style="background:#cfc;
| 77
| April 1
| Portland
| 
| Devin Vassell (22)
| Zach Collins (9)
| Tre Jones (9)
| AT&T Center17,512
| 32–45
|-style="background:#cfc;
| 78
| April 3
| Portland
| 
| Keldon Johnson (28)
| Zach Collins (13)
| Tre Jones (7)
| AT&T Center15,816
| 33–45
|-style="background:#cfc;
| 79
| April 5
| @ Denver
| 
| Johnson, Vassell (20)
| Johnson, Pöltl, Vassell (8)
| Tre Jones (10)
| Ball Arena17,037
| 34–45
|-style="background:#fcc;
| 80
| April 7
| @ Minnesota
| 
| Keldon Johnson (20)
| Jakob Pöltl (17)
| Tre Jones (8)
| Target Center17,136
| 34–46
|-style="background:#fcc;
| 81
| April 9
| Golden State
| 
| Lonnie Walker (24)
| Collins, Landale (11)
| Tre Jones (7)
| AT&T Center18,627
| 34–47
|-style="background:#fcc;
| 82
| April 10
| @ Dallas
| 
| Keldon Johnson (24)
| Jakob Pöltl (10)
| Dejounte Murray (7)
| American Airlines Center20,270
| 34-48

Play-in

|- style="background:#fcc;"
| 1
| April 13
| @ New Orleans
| 
| Devin Vassell (23)
| Pöltl, Murray (9)
| Dejounte Murray (5)
| Smoothie King Center18,610
| 0–1

Transactions

Trades

Free agency

Re-signed

Additions

Subtractions

References

San Antonio Spurs seasons
San Antonio Spurs
San Antonio Spurs
San Antonio Spurs